Srednje is a settlement in the hills above the left bank of the Drava River west of Maribor in northeastern Slovenia. It belongs to the City Municipality of Maribor.

There is a small chapel-shrine with a belfry on a hill to the north of the main settlement. It was built in 1922.

References

External links
Srednje on Geopedia

Populated places in the City Municipality of Maribor